The Organic Seed Growers and Trade Association (OSGATA) is a trade association based in Maine, United States, which represents organic farmers, seed growers and seed suppliers. 

It is known primarily for its March 2011 initiation of a lawsuit against Monsanto Corporation to stop it from suing farmers who have been "contaminated" by their genetically modified seeds.<ref>Monsanto versus the people, Aljazeera. January 14, 2013.</ref> In January 2013, the US Federal Court of Appeals heard the oral arguments appealing the dismissal of the case.

OSGATA appealed to the Supreme Court which declined to hear the case.

OSGATA presents this case as protecting members against prosecution following "accidental contamination" with Monsanto patented crops, but Monsanto's chief counsel clarified that "Monsanto never has and has committed it never will sue if our patented seed or traits are found in a farmer's field as a result of inadvertent means." For example, in Monsanto Canada Inc v Schmeiser'', an initial claim of accidental contamination is balanced against a finding of fact that 95–98% of the crop was actually infringing.

References

External links 

 Official website

Organic farming organizations
Agricultural organizations based in the United States
Organic farming in the United States

Non-profit organizations based in Maine